Walter Piatkowski, Jr. (born June 11, 1945) is a retired American professional basketball player.

A 6'8" forward, Piatkowski began his career at Toledo Woodward High School then starred at Bowling Green State University, where he was a Converse Honorable Mention All-American in 1968. He then played in the American Basketball Association from 1968 to 1970 as a member of the Denver Rockets. He received ABA All-Rookie Team honors with the Rockets in 1969 after averaging 12.2 points per game. When the Rockets acquired Spencer Haywood the next season, Piatkowski saw his playing time drop, and in 1970, he briefly retired to work as a teacher. He returned to the ABA in the fall of 1971 as a member of The Floridians, but he was waived just a month into that season. He later became a salesman with a paper company. He is Polish American.

Piatkowski's son Eric Piatkowski played basketball at the University of Nebraska; was drafted into the NBA in 1994 as the 15th overall pick by the Indiana Pacers; and played 14 years in the NBA, mostly with the Los Angeles Clippers.

References

1945 births
Living people
American men's basketball players
American people of Polish descent
Basketball players from Ohio
Bowling Green Falcons men's basketball players
Denver Rockets players
Miami Floridians players
Power forwards (basketball)
San Francisco Warriors draft picks
Sportspeople from Toledo, Ohio